Gundam Factory Yokohama is an entertainment complex located at Yamashita Pier in Yokohama, Japan. Its main feature is a moving Gundam, an 18-metre tall pilot-operated "mech" (a large mechanical automaton with a human operator inside) from the Japanese animated franchise Gundam, the 16th biggest media franchise in the world. It is the first moving mech of its type.

Originally planned to open by October 2020 to both celebrate the 40th Anniversary of the Gundam franchise and for the 2020 Tokyo Olympics, the construction of the exhibit was delayed due to the coronavirus pandemic. The site opened 19 December 2020 and will remain open until March 31, 2022. The closing date was however delayed to March 31, 2023 due to the Covid-19 Pandemic, and then delayed again to March 31, 2024, due to the lasting success. On 18 December, rock band Luna Sea performed the 40th anniversary's theme song, "The Beyond", on live TV at the opening ceremony. There are two features to the exhibit:

Gundam Dock 
The primary exhibition of the complex is the moving Gundam mech. Named the RX-78F00 Gundam, it is the 3rd statue constructed to a 1:1 scale with its anime counterpart in Japan, following the 2009 RX-78-2 and 2017 RX-0 each constructed at Tokyo Gundam Base.

Gundam Lab 
The Gundam lab exhibition features information about the construction of the RX-78F00, a virtual reality dome that simulates the interior of the Gundam's cockpit, a cafe with Gundam themed products and a GUNPLA merchandise store.

Cultural significance 
The site celebrates the 40th anniversary of the premiere of the first Gundam series. Yoshiyuki Tomino, the creator of Gundam, personally worked on the project. Gundam has become the 16th highest grossing media franchise, and has been highly regarded for its influence in other media.

References

Tourist attractions in Yokohama
Gundam
2020 establishments in Japan
2020 Summer Olympics